Aimata may refer to
Aimata, Minami City, Gunma Prefecture, Japan, the location of the Aimata Dam
Pōmare IV, ʻAimata Pōmare IV Vahine-o-Punuateraʻitua, Queen of Tahiti from 1827 to 1877
Aimata Leroy, French Polynesian relay runner, participant in Athletics at the 1989 South Pacific Mini Games